El camino del alma (The path of the soul) is the third studio album released by Mexican Latin pop singer Cristian Castro. It was released on August 15, 1994. Its major hit was the cover Juan Gabriel's "Mañana, Mañana". The album was nominated in 1996 for Best Latin Pop Album in the Grammy Awards and a Lo Nuestro Award for Pop Album of the Year.

Track listing
 "Mañana" - 04:13
 "Con Tu Amor" - 03:56
 "Estás Mintiendo" - 04:00
 "Azul Gris" - 03:30
 "Piel y Seda" - 05:08
 "Con Esa Morena" - 03:57
 "Yo Sigo Aquí" - 04:10
 "Tú Me Llenas" - 04:54
 "Mi Querido Amor (My Cherie Amour)" - 04:30
 "No Te Vayas" - 03:18
 "Azul Gris" (Instrumental) - 03:30
 "Morelía" - 04:35

Charts

References

1994 albums
Cristian Castro albums
Fonovisa Records albums